A Grande Mentira is a Brazilian telenovela produced and broadcast by TV Globo. It premiered on 10 June 1968 and ended on 4 July 1969, with a total of 341 episodes. It is the fifth "novela das sete" to be aired in its timeslot. It was created by Hedy Maia and directed by Fábio Sabag.

Cast

References

External links 
 

TV Globo telenovelas
1968 telenovelas
Brazilian telenovelas
1968 Brazilian television series debuts
1969 Brazilian television series endings
Portuguese-language telenovelas